James Street may refer to:

People
 James Street (cricketer) (1839–1906), English cricketer and umpire
 James Street (novelist) (1903–1954), US journalist, Baptist minister, and novelist
 James Street (American football) (1948–2013), American football quarterback

Places
 James Street (Hamilton, Ontario), arterial road in Hamilton, Ontario, Canada
 James Street Bridge (Kansas City, Kansas), road crossing over the Kansas River
 James Street Railway Station (India), railway station in Hyderabad, Andhra Pradesh, India
 Liverpool James Street railway station, railway station in Liverpool, England
 James Street, Marylebone, street in London, England
 James Street, Northbridge, in Perth, Western Australia

Others
 James Street F.C.,  based in Blackburn, England, which merged to form Blackburn Olympic F.C.
 Jim Street, a character from the TV series S.W.A.T.
 James Street (album), an album by Jimmy Ponder

Street, James